Mikko Hirvonen (born 31 July 1980) is a Finnish former rally driver, and a current Rally-Raid driver, who drove in the World Rally Championship. He placed third in the drivers' championship and helped Ford to the manufacturers' title in both 2006 and 2007. In 2008, 2009, 2011 and 2012 he finished runner-up to Sébastien Loeb. Hirvonen's co-driver was Jarmo Lehtinen from the 2003 season until his retirement in 2014, Lehtinen had replaced Miikka Anttila who co-drove with Hirvonen in the 2002 season.

Career

2002–05

Hirvonen won the under 2000 cc Group A Finnish Rally Championship in 2002. As one of the World Rally Championship's younger competitors he made his debut full-time in a third Ford World Rally Team entry in the 2003 season, scoring one points finish for sixth place at the Cyprus Rally.

After Richard Burns was diagnosed with brain tumor in late 2003, Hirvonen moved to take his place as team-mate to 2003 world champion Petter Solberg in 2004 for the Subaru World Rally Team. He scored points in ten rallies, but his best event result was only fourth, at the Rally Argentina and at the season-ending Rally Australia. These performances were not enough to secure a seat for the 2005 season. Hirvonen then campaigned a two-year-old Ford Focus RS WRC 03 and led one rally during the course of the year, and scored a career-best third-place finish at the Rally Catalunya as a privateer.

2006–07

It was Hirvonen's showings on such events that brought him back to the attention of Ford, whose factory arm signed him for the 2006 season. Hirvonen drove the new Ford Focus RS WRC 06 partnered with Marcus Grönholm. Hirvonen took his first World Rally Championship win at the Rally Australia, and placed second at the Rally d'Italia Sardegna, the Rally of Turkey and the Rally New Zealand. By finishing on the podium for six rallies in a row, he secured a third place overall in the drivers' world championship.

In the 2007 season, Hirvonen started with a fifth place at the 75ème Rallye Automobile de Monte-Carlo and a third place at the 56th Uddeholm Swedish Rally. He took his second WRC victory in Norway and later also won the 2007 Rally Japan and the season-ending 2007 Wales Rally GB. He finished third in the driver's championship, 17 points behind Sébastien Loeb. With Grönholm, Hirvonen secured the manufacturers' title for Ford for the second year in running.

2008–14

On 17 December, Hirvonen was officially named as the number one BP-Ford Abu Dhabi factory driver for the 2008 season, after Marcus Grönholm's retirement. His young compatriot Jari-Matti Latvala was named his teammate in the second factory Focus. Hirvonen started the season with a second place at the 2008 Monte Carlo Rally, which was his and the BP-Ford Team's target. In Sweden, he was considered as favourite, but had to settle for second being unable to keep up with his younger teammate's pace. After Rally Mexico, where he had punctures and had to change a wheel, and in Rally Argentina, where he retired from the lead and then re-joined under SupeRally rules to take fifth place, Hirvonen took his first win of the season at the inaugural Jordan Rally.

Hirvonen took his second victory of the season in Turkey. Despite being the favourite to win at his home event, the Rally Finland, he could not match the pace of his title rival Loeb and finished a close second. In New Zealand, Hirvonen was leading when he had a puncture and a spin on the penultimate stage, dropping him to third behind the Citroën drivers Loeb and Sordo. The stage was a disaster for Ford as Hirvonen's teammate Latvala and Stobart M-Sport Ford driver François Duval both crashed out from second and fifth place, respectively. Hirvonen then dropped eight points behind Loeb in the drivers' championship with only four more rallies to go.

Loeb soon secured his number one spot in the drivers' championship in Japan, but the manufacturers' title fight was still open as Ford trailed Citroën by eleven points. That changed when Hirvonen rolled his car onto its roof in stage five of the season-ending Wales Rally GB. He was bumped down to 44th as a result, but managed to recover to eighth place by the end of the rally. This result meant that Hirvonen and co-driver Lehtinen became the first WRC drivers ever to score points on every round of a season.

Hirvonen started the 2009 season with a third place behind the Citroën duo at the Rally Ireland. At the Rally Norway, which he won in 2007, he narrowly lost the win to Loeb after a tight three-day battle. He went to finish second to Loeb also in the following two rallies in Cyprus and Portugal. In Portugal, Hirvonen tied the record for the longest points finish streak in the series (22 events) with his former teammate Marcus Grönholm. In the next round in Argentina, Hirvonen was six seconds behind Loeb after 14 stages when his Focus RS WRC incurred an engine problem. His retirement saw Loeb take a 20-point lead over him in the drivers' standings.

At the Rally d'Italia Sardegna, Hirvonen and Loeb both dropped time on day one in a bid to gain a better road position. After Loeb incurred a puncture, Hirvonen found himself unable to catch teammate Latvala, who had been pushing in front from start to finish. In the following Acropolis Rally in Greece, Hirvonen took his first win of the season. With Loeb crashing out, he reduced the Frenchman's championship lead to seven points. At the following Rally Poland, Loeb crashed again, although recovered to seventh, with Hirvonen winning his second consecutive rally he moved to the top of the standings. In Finland, Hirvonen took the lead on the first proper stage and continued pulling away from Loeb to take his debut win in his home event. A few weeks later, in Australia, Mikko was again in a tight battle with Loeb, where Loeb eventually won. Unfortunately for Loeb his car was found to have rollbar irregularities, as did Dani Sordo and Sébastien Ogier. They were then given 1 minute time penalties, which handed Hirvonen the win and 10 points. Hirvonen led the 2009 Championship by a point from Sebastien Loeb, and needed a win to clinch the title, but a hard landing from a jump on the penultimate stage caused the bonnet hinge to fail, as time ticked by to get rid of the bonnet cover, the Championship was handed to Loeb.

In 2010, Hirvonen continued his partnership with Ford for the last time with the Ford Focus RS WRC before switching to the new 1.6 Ecoboost Ford Fiesta RS WRC in 2011. In 2012, Hirvonen changed his seat to a Citroën DS3 WRC to partner Sebastien Loeb in the Citroën Total World Rally Team.

 His first rally win for Citroën was the fourth rally of the 2012 season in Portugal to provisionally take the lead in the championship, but he was later disqualified from the event due to irregularities with the clutch and turbo in his Citroën DS3 WRC.

2013 was a disappointing year for Hirvonen, finishing on the podium just five times, collecting no wins. He ended the season with one of his biggest accidents ever in Wales. He finished the season in 4th place.

On 13 December 2013, it was confirmed Hirvonen would re-join M-Sport, formerly Ford for the 2014 season. The season was remarkably good for him, as he grabbed two podium places, and three power stage victories meant he was placed fourth in the championship, behind the dominant Volkswagen trio, Sebastien Ogier, Jari-Matti Latvala and Andreas Mikkelsen.

On 6 November 2014, it was announced that he will retire from the sport, moments before the start of the Wales Rally GB.

2015-present

In 2015, Hirvonen began to compete in rally raid for X-Raid with a Mini Countryman, finishing third at the Baja Aragón with co-driver Michel Périn. In January 2016 he finished fourth at the 2016 Dakar Rally. In the 2016 FIA Cross Country Rally World Cup, the Finn won the Hungarian Baja and finished third at the eAbu Dhabi Desert Challenge and Baja Aragón, ranking fourth in the overall standings. The driver finished 13th at the 2017 Dakar Rally.

WRC victories

IRC victories

Career results

Complete WRC results

IRC results

ERC results

Dakar Rally results

References

External links

Official website 
BP Ford World Rally Team
M-Sport Ford WRC team website

1980 births
Living people
Dakar Rally drivers
Finnish rally drivers
Intercontinental Rally Challenge drivers
World Rally Championship drivers
Citroën Racing drivers
M-Sport drivers
Škoda Motorsport drivers